Fedja Marušič (born 10 October 1971 in Solkan) is a Slovenian slalom canoeist who competed from the late 1980s to the mid-2000s (decade).

He won two silver medals in the K1 team event at the ICF Canoe Slalom World Championships, earning them in 1995 and 1999. He also won a silver and a bronze in the same event at the European Championships.

Marušič also competed in two Summer Olympics, earning his best finish of 15th in the K1 event in Sydney in 2000.

World Cup individual podiums

References

Sports-reference.com profile

1971 births
Canoeists at the 1996 Summer Olympics
Canoeists at the 2000 Summer Olympics
Living people
Olympic canoeists of Slovenia
Slovenian male canoeists
People from the City Municipality of Nova Gorica
Medalists at the ICF Canoe Slalom World Championships